Herpetogramma mimeticalis is a moth in the family Crambidae. It was described by Hering in 1901. It is found on Sumatra.

References

Moths described in 1901
Herpetogramma
Moths of Indonesia